Best Day is a 2012 album by Dala.

Best Day(s) may also refer to: 

 "Best Day", a song by Carpark North from All Things to All People, 2005
 "Best Day", a song by Kesha from the soundtrack album of the Angry Birds Movie 2, 2019
 Best Days (Carpark North album), 2010
 Best Days (Matt White album), 2007, or the title song
 Best Days (Tamela Mann album), 2012, or the title song
 Best Days, a 2005 album by Amy Nuttall, or the title song
 "Best Days", a song by Blur from the album The Great Escape, 1995
 "Best Days", a 2007 song by Graham Colton

See also
 The Best Day (disambiguation)